FC Sochaux-Montbéliard won Division 1 season 1934/1935 of the French Association Football League with 48 points.

Participating teams

 Olympique Alès
 FC Antibes
 AS Cannes
 SC Fives
 Olympique Lillois
 Olympique de Marseille
 SO Montpellier
 FC Mulhouse
 SC Nîmes
 RC Paris
 Red Star Olympique
 Stade Rennais UC
 Excelsior AC Roubaix
 FC Sète
 FC Sochaux-Montbéliard
 RC Strasbourg

Final table

Promoted from Division 2, who will play in Division 1 season 1935/1936:
 FC Metz: Champion of Division 2
 US Valenciennes-Anzin: Runner-up Division 2

Results

Top goalscorers

References
 Division 1 season 1934-1935 at pari-et-gagne.com

Ligue 1 seasons
France
1